Rheinbrohl is a municipality in the district of Neuwied, in Rhineland-Palatinate, Germany.

A reconstructed Roman watchtower ("Römerturm 1") marks the beginning of the Germanic limes.

References

Neuwied (district)